German submarine U-553 was a Type VIIC U-boat built for Nazi Germany's Kriegsmarine for service during World War II.

Design
German Type VIIC submarines were preceded by the shorter Type VIIB submarines. U-553 had a displacement of  when at the surface and  while submerged. She had two shafts and two  propellers.

U-553 was fitted with five  torpedo tubes (four fitted at the bow and one at the stern), fourteen torpedoes, one  SK C/35 naval gun, 220 rounds, and a  C/30 anti-aircraft gun. The boat had a complement of between forty-four and sixty.

Service history
Her keel was laid down 21 November 1939, by Blohm & Voss in Hamburg as yard number 529. She was launched on 7 November 1940 and commissioned on 23 December, with Kapitänleutnant Karl Thurmann in command. He was captain for her entire career.

Her service began with training under the 7th U-boat Flotilla and moved on to operations on 1 April 1941. She then transferred to the 3rd flotilla on 1 December 1942. She was a member of ten wolfpacks. She moved from Kiel in Germany to Bergen in Norway in April 1941.

First patrol
The boat departed Bergen on 19 April 1941 and headed for the Atlantic via the gap between the Faeroe and Shetland Islands. She arrived at her new base of St. Nazaire in occupied France on 2 May 1941 after suffering serious engine trouble.

Second patrol
Departing St. Nazaire on 7 June, she achieved success north of the Azores, by sinking the Susan Maersk (she went down in 90 seconds) and the Ranella (she broke in two) both on 12 June 1941.

Third, fourth and fifth patrols
Her next three sorties met with mixed fortune; her third patrol saw no success, despite ranging far and wide over the north Atlantic.

The boat's fifth patrol took her toward the eastern Canadian/US coast where she succeeded in damaging the Diala on 15 January 1942 and sinking the Innerøy on 22 January.

Sixth and seventh patrols
The boat's sixth patrol took her from St. Nazaire as far north as the Faeroe Islands. It was unsuccessful.

Outing number seven saw the submarine penetrate the Gulf of St. Lawrence where she sank two ships; the Leto and the Nicoya. The Mattawin was sent to the bottom of the Atlantic.

Eighth patrol
The boat's eighth patrol began with her departure from St. Nazaire on 19 July and to which she returned on 17 September after 61 days at sea, her longest.

Ninth patrol
Her last full patrol commenced on 23 November 1942; she sank the Charles L D on 9 December 1942. She returned to France, but this time La Pallice on 18 December.

Loss
Her tenth and final sortie began with her departure from La Pallice on 16 January 1943. On the 20th, she sent a radio message: "Sehrohr unklar" (periscope unready for action), and was never heard from again. She had suffered no casualties to her crew until lost with all hands. She most probably sank because of technical problems and was officially declared missing on 28 January 1943.

Wolfpacks
U-553 took part in ten wolfpacks, namely:
 West (13 – 20 June 1941) 
 Grönland (10 – 23 August 1941) 
 Kurfürst (23 August – 2 September 1941) 
 Seewolf (2 – 13 September 1941) 
 Zieten (6 – 22 January 1942) 
 Westwall (2 – 12 March 1942) 
 York (12 – 26 March 1942) 
 Pirat (29 July – 3 August 1942) 
 Draufgänger (29 November – 11 December 1942) 
 Landsknecht (19 – 20 January 1943)

Summary of raiding history

U-553 in fiction
Neal Stephenson's novel Cryptonomicon includes a fictitious U-553 which runs aground about ten miles north of Qwghlm, a fictional pair of islands, Inner Qwghlm and Outer Qwghlm, off the northwestern coast of Great Britain.

References

Notes

Citations

Bibliography

External links

German Type VIIC submarines
U-boats commissioned in 1940
Missing U-boats of World War II
World War II submarines of Germany
1940 ships
Ships built in Hamburg
U-boats sunk in 1943
U-boats sunk by unknown causes
Maritime incidents in January 1943